James McShane (28 February 1871 – 25 October 1946) was an Australian rules footballer for the Geelong Football Club. McShane was the first player in the VFL/AFL competition to kick ten goals or more in a match when he scored eleven goals against St Kilda in 1899.

His brothers Henry and Joe McShane also played with Geelong, and later at Carlton.

References

External links

1871 births
1946 deaths
Geelong Football Club (VFA) players
Geelong Football Club players
Australian rules footballers from Geelong